State Route 142 (SR 142) is a numbered state highway in the U.S. state of Maine that runs from U.S. Route 2 (US 2) and SR 17 in Dixfield to SR 16 and SR 27 in Kingfield.

Route description
The route begins at its southern terminus in Dixfield. It heads north through Carthage before turning left at SR 156 in Weld. It goes north again before turning right onto a  concurrency with SR 4 in Phillips. It turns left twice there before going northwest to Kingfield, then another left turn leads to the route's northern terminus.

Major junctions

References

External links

142
Transportation in Oxford County, Maine
Transportation in Franklin County, Maine